Centro de Enseñanza Técnica y Superior (CETYS) is a private Institution of Higher Education founded in 1961, located in the state of Baja California. CETYS is a three-campus university system in Engineering, Business and the Social Sciences.

History

Under the support of a group of businessmen, who formed the Instituto Educativo del Noroeste (IENAC), a not-for-profit civil association that supports CETYS. The institution opened its doors on September 20, 1961, in Mexicali.  Tijuana began operating in 1970, with the Ensenada campus following in 1975.

Today, IENAC is led by Gustavo Vildosola Ramos, while Dr. Fernando Leon Garcia is the university President.

Organizational structure
CETYS possesses an Academic Advisory Council (CCA) responsible for analyzing and discussing transcendental issues of interest to the CETYS University System.

Campuses
Ensenada
Mexicali
Tijuana

Alumni
 Francisco Vega de Lamadrid, governor of the state of Baja California & former mayor of Tijuana, Baja California
 Lupita Jones, Miss Universe 1991
Abe Vazquez, Musician and producer with Vazquez Sounds
Marina del Pilar Ávila Olmeda, politician

References 

Private education in Mexico
Universities and colleges in Baja California
Education in Mexicali
Educational institutions established in 1961
International Baccalaureate schools in Mexico
1961 establishments in Mexico